The North American Football Union (NAFU;) is a regional grouping under CONCACAF of national football organizations in the North American Zone. The NAFU has no organizational structure. The statutes say "CONCACAF shall recognize ... The North American Football Union (NAFU)" (emphasis added). The NAFU provide one of CONCACAF's representatives to the FIFA Executive Committee.

History

Member associations 
The North American Football Union has three member associations:

The 2015 edition of the CONCACAF Statutes notes that "Notwithstanding their affiliation to (the) NAFU, (The) Bahamas and Bermuda will participate in the competitions of (the) CFU."

Future members
, who could join UEFA due to political links with Denmark or CONCACAF due to geographical proximity, announced in May 2022 that the association had officially begun the process of becoming a member of CONCACAF and were expected to attend the body’s next congress with observer status. It was anticipated that the association would submit its formal application by 2024 or 2025.

, announced in September 2019 that The Football Association of Saint Pierre and Miquelon is expected to build a suitable venue with the goal of becoming a member of CONCACAF in 2023.

. is currently member of CONCACAF and  Caribbean Football Union. In future Bermuda may join NAFU.

Competitions

National teams

Until 2017, Canada, Mexico, and the United States automatically qualified to the CONCACAF Gold Cup. Now the CONCACAF Nations League serves as qualification to the Gold Cup.

 1990 North American Nations Cup
 1991 North American Nations Cup

Clubs

The Leagues Cup is a club tournament between teams from Major League Soccer and Liga MX that was established in 2019. It is the North American Zone's regional qualification tournament for the CONCACAF Champions League.

The North American SuperLiga was a club tournament between two North American zone leagues that ran from 2007 to 2010. It was an official tournament sanctioned by CONCACAF, but not organized by the federation. When zone qualifiers were used for the CONCACAF Champions Cup, Bermudian clubs played against Mexican and/or American clubs.

The Campeones Cup is an annual match established in 2018, held between the winners of the previous Major League Soccer season and the winners of the Campeón de Campeones of Liga MX.

Major tournament records 

Legend
  

 – Champion
 – Runner-up
 – Third place
 – Fourth place
QF – Quarter-finals
R16 – Round of 16 (since 1986)
2R – Second group stage (1982)
GS – Group stage (1930 and since 1950)
1R – First round (1934 and 1938)

 q – Qualified for upcoming tournament
 — Did not qualify
 — Did not enter/withdrew
 — Banned
 — Hosts

FIFA World Cup

FIFA Women's World Cup

FIFA Confederations Cup

See also 
Central American Football Union
Caribbean Football Union
North American Football Confederation
Central American and Caribbean Football Confederation

References

External links 
 NAFU - North American Football Union at Football Mywapblog

 North American Football Union
Association football sub-confederations